Almaty Arena (formerly Almaty Ice Palace) is a multi-purpose indoor arena located in Almaty, Kazakhstan which was opened on 18 September 2016 and seats 12,000 spectators for ice hockey. Apart from hosting ice hockey matches, the arena is venue for boxing, figure skating, basketball, concerts, and other events. It is one of the venues to host the 2017 Winter Universiade. The arena is located in the north of punched Ryskulov Avenue, to the west from Momyshuly street in the Alatau District.

History
Almaty's successful bid to host the 2017 Winter Universiade, coupled with its (unsuccessful) bid to host the 2022 Winter Olympics, drove the need to build an ice hockey arena meeting the standards of the International Ice Hockey Federation (IIHF). On 27 March 2014, the city's mayor Akhmetzhan Yessimov announced the building of the new arena for 12,000 spectators and a minor arena for 3,000. The arenas were projected to cost $170 million and $89 million respectively.

Structure and facilities
The complex consists of three units: the ice arena with 12,000 seats, a training rink with a recreation complex, and a swimming pool.

Special attention is given to the technology of ice freezing. 120 cubic metres of water is needed for each rink pouring. The water is pre-treated from various mechanical impurities, iron, chlorine and the salts, and then falls into the softener system and maintain the desired storage temperature. Ice surface is aligned with special ice machines to achieve the desired thickness - 5 cm after a complete freezing.

Sport events 

 2016, October - IV International Kazak Kuresi Championship "Eurasia Barysy

 2016, October 29 - Pro Boxing Night (Kanat Islam - Patrick Allotey) for the WBO, IBO and WBA Fedelatin titles.
 2016, December - Kazakhstan Figure Skating Championship
 2017, April 1 - MMA Fight Nights 
 2017, April - UEFA Futsal Cup Final Four 2016/2017 (Inter, Sporting, Gazprom-Yugra, Kairat).
 2017, Final stage of National Student Futsal League games
 2018, December - TITAN FC 51 international MMA tournament
 2019, March - Professional boxing night with fights for four local WBA and WBC titles 
 2019, March 30 - Ilya Averbukh Ice Show featuring Alexei Yagudin, Elisabeth Tursynbaeva and others.
 2019, April 26 - 28 - UEFA Champions League Final Four 2018/2019 (Inter, Sporting, Barça, Kairat)

2021 - NFC Championship
 2021 - city cultural and sports festival Almaty Urban Fest
 2021 2021 - World Curling Cup

Music events 

 2017, June - VIA Gra concert
 2017, September - VI Eurasian Music Award of the Muzzone TV channel "EMA 2017"
 2017, September - Platinum ABBA tribute show
 2018, March - DDT concert
 2018, May 26 - Scriptonite concert
 2018, June - "Leningrad" concert
 2018, October - "Hands Up!" concert
 2018, November - concert of Garik Sukachev and the Untouchables
 2019, March - concert of Bi-2

References

External links

 

Indoor ice hockey venues in Kazakhstan
Sports venues completed in 2016
Buildings and structures in Almaty